The Customs Department, also called the Thai Customs, is the customs department of Thailand under the Ministry of Finance.

History 

On 4 July 1874, King Chulalongkorn established Hor Ratsadakorn Pipat to collect all type of tax and become a formation of Custom Department. Since the custom policy was complicated, the Custom Department developed the organization and management to be more effective by corporate the department to under the control of the Ministry of Finance by Finance Minister of Thailand.

Organizational structure

See also
Customs law of Thailand

External links

References 

Customs services
Law enforcement in Thailand
Government departments of Thailand
Ministry of Finance (Thailand)